Phillip "Phil" Gilman (born 25 December 1965) is an former English professional darts player.

Darts career
Gilman won the 1991 London Classic darts tournament champion beating Stephen Woodfield of Wales in the final.

Gilman rose to prominence by winning the prestigious British Open in 1992, beating Craig Clancy, Paul Dillon and Dennis Priestley in the final. He made his television debut on the hit game show Bullseye, competing in the charity bronze bully round, scoring 200 points. Despite his British Open success, Gilman never played at the BDO World Darts Championship, but did play in the 1992 Winmau World Masters beating Denmark's Jann Hoffmann in the first round before losing to Mike Gregory.

Gilman then played in the 1996 PDC World Matchplay he beating Frans Harmsen his losing in the first round to Jamie Harvey. He then disappeared from the scene before briefly returning to the PDC scene in 2006, playing the JR+Vauxhall Holiday Park Norfolk Open, losing in the first round to Peter Allen. Gilman Quit the PDC in 2006.

External links
Phil Gilman's profile and stats on Darts Database

English darts players
British Darts Organisation players
Living people
Professional Darts Corporation associate players
1965 births
Sportspeople from London